Animorphs is a science fantasy series of children's books written by Katherine Applegate and her husband Michael Grant, writing together under the name K. A. Applegate, and published by Scholastic. It is told in first person, with all six main characters taking turns narrating the books through their own perspectives. Horror, war, dehumanization, sanity, morality, innocence, leadership, freedom, family, and growing up are the core themes of the series.

The series was originally conceived as a three-part series called The Changelings, in which Jake was named Matt, and his little brother Joseph took the place of Cassie.

Published between June 1996 and May 2001, the series consists of 54 books and includes ten companion books, eight of which fit into the series' continuity (the Animorphs Chronicles and Megamorphs books) and two that are gamebooks not fitting into the continuity (the Alternamorphs books).

The books were adapted into a television series of the same name on Nickelodeon, YTV and Global Television Network, which ran from 1998 to 1999. The series has also been adapted to audiobook form as well as a series of graphic novels starting in 2020. A film adaptation was announced in September 2015.

Plot summary
The story revolves around five humans: Jake, Marco, Cassie, Rachel and Tobias, and one alien, Aximili-Esgarrouth-Isthill (nicknamed Ax), who obtain the ability to transform into any animal they touch. Naming themselves "Animorphs" (a portmanteau of "animal morphers"), they use their ability to battle a secret alien infiltration of Earth by a parasitic race of aliens resembling large slugs called Yeerks, that can take any living creatures as a host by entering and merging with their brain through the ear canal. The Animorphs fight as a guerilla force against the Yeerks who are led by Visser Three.

Throughout the series, the Animorphs carefully protect their identities; the Yeerks assume that the Animorphs are a strike force sent by the Andalites, the alien race to which Ax belongs that created the transformation technology, to prevent them from conquering Earth. To protect their families from Yeerk reprisals, the Animorphs maintain this façade.

Though the Animorphs can assume the form of any animal they touch to acquire the DNA, there are several limitations to the ability. The most vital is that they cannot stay in animal form for more than two hours, or they will be unable to return to human form and the morphs become permanent. Others include having to de-morph back to human in between morphs, only tight clothing being able to be carried over with a morph, and having to consistently maintain concentration during a morph to prevent the animal's natural instincts from overwhelming their human intellect. A benefit to morphing is that it allows the team to heal any superficial, non-genetic injury, sustained as a human or in a morph. Also, while in morph, they can telepathically communicate with anyone nearby in what they call 'thought-speak'.

Development
In an interview with Publishers Weekly, Applegate talked about the source of inspiration and realization for the Animorphs series: "I grew up loving animals and lived with the usual suburban menagerie of dogs, cats and gerbils", she said "I really wanted to find a way to get kids into the heads of various species and decided that a science-fiction premise was the way to do this". Applegate tried to accurately depict the various animals, and did research such as visiting "a raptor center where they rehabilitate injured birds". "When Tobias becomes a hawk, I want the reader to see the world as a hawk might see it—to soar on the warm breezes and hurtle toward the ground to make a kill", she said.

To develop the characters for Animorphs, Applegate would go through teenage magazines such as YM and Seventeen (both of which are referenced in the books when describing Rachel), cutting out pictures and piecing them together to get an idea of what sort of children the Animorphs would look like. Applegate stated in an interview online that many of the names for her alien creatures, races, and locations are actually scrambled names of local street signs or companies that she happens to notice. For instance, the word nothlit was derived from the hotel name Hilton. In another interview, Applegate stated that she originally wanted the alien Andalite to have more standard and familiar forms, but was told by Scholastic to  be more creative with the designs, which led to her giving them such distinctive look.

According to the Anibase, Applegate did not make up the titles for the Animorphs books: it was up to the Scholastic editors to create the titles for the books based on the outlines provided by the author, having to select a word that not only fit the book's storyline, but sounded good with the characteristic "The" preface. One of the author's favorite books, The Lord of the Rings, lent several words and images to Animorphs: the Sindarin plural word for Orc, "yrch", became Yeerk; the flaming red Eye of Sauron inspired the Crayak, and Ax's middle name, "Esgarrouth", is based on a town in the books called Esgaroth. The human name of Ax's brother, Elfangor, is Alan Fangor and his last name is in reference to the Fangor region or Fangorn Forest. Also there was a minor reference to Gondor, in the form of a fictional company named "Gondor Industries" in the 14th book.

Applegate's writing was inspired by her family. All books after The Unknown were dedicated to Applegate's child, Jake, as well as her husband and co-writer, Michael. Her daughter was born premature in 1997, and Applegate worked on the Animorphs series at night, in the lobby of the hospital where she was in Neonatal Intensive Care (NIC).

Characters

Animorphs
Jake: Jake Berenson is the leader of Animorphs. Despite being a natural at it, he's very reluctant to lead the team, though he ultimately accepts the role. The war takes on a deeper meaning for Jake when he finds out that his older brother Tom has been infested by a Yeerk, it is also one of the only things that holds him together throughout the series; if not for that he would probably crack from all the pressure and life-taking decisions. He is the only member of the team to have some relationship with all of the other human members prior to the war: Jake and Rachel are cousins. He and Marco have been best friends since early childhood. He and Cassie have always had an attraction to each other; they share their first kiss in book 26 and are in a relationship throughout the second half of the series. He is one of the few people who acknowledges Tobias and treats him with kindness.
Rachel: Rachel has the most bloodthirsty nature in the group, earning her the nickname of "Xena, Warrior Princess". She is also good in gymnastics and has an interest in fashion. She is Jake's cousin and is Cassie's best friend, although her warrior nature often conflicts with Cassie's pacifistic mindset. She and Tobias develop an attraction for one another during the series. She also has two younger sisters, Jordan and Sara.
Tobias: Tobias has low self-esteem and was often bullied in school before becoming an Animorph. With both his parents dead, he lives with his aunt and uncle, who share custody of him. Tobias becomes trapped in a red-tailed hawk form in the first book. During the series, he regains the power to morph, but his natural form is now  a hawk. Even though Rachel wants him to morph back into a human and stay human for more than two hours, he remains in the form of a red-tailed hawk, because permanently returning to the form of a human would incapacitate him from fighting the Yeerks. Tobias admires Jake because Jake always showed him respect and kindness when no one else did. Also, Tobias develops a close friendship with Ax.
Cassie: Cassie lives on a farm with her parents, who are veterinarians. She is African-American and the most knowledgeable about animals; also, she is an environmentalist. Her best friend is Rachel, despite the disparity in their personalities and lifestyles. Cassie loves nature and animals. She is also an estreen, the Andalite term for someone who is naturally talented at morphing.
Marco: Marco is the source of comic relief in the series and Jake's best friend. He is Latin-American, and he also coined the term "Animorphs". Marco often proposes the most direct solution to any problem, even if it involves sacrifice. He lives with his father, who is depressed about his mother's death, which happened in a boating accident. At first, he does not want to fight the Yeerks because he fears his father will not survive without him. He redecides when he finds out his mother is still alive, as the host body for Visser One, which is the leader of the Yeerk invasion.
Aximili-Esgarrouth-Isthill ("Ax"): Aximili-Esgarrouth-Isthill is an Andalite who is thought to be the only survivor of a bloody battle that took place in outer space. His ship has crash landed on Earth. He is the younger brother of Prince Elfangor-Sirinial-Shamtul, who gave the Animorphs their morphing ability and shortly thereafter, died. He considers Jake a prince and is a strong friend of Tobias. The human Animorphs call him 'Ax' for the sake of easily pronouncing his name.

Other main characters
Visser Three: Born as Esplin 9466 Primary and later promoted to Visser One, is the leader of the Yeerk forces on Earth and the primary antagonist of the series. He believed the planet was his inheritance from Edriss 562, whose status was then 'Visser One'. Sadistic and cruel, Three has a penchant for torture and almost totally possesses the body of a full-grown Andalite warrior, Alloran-Semitur-Corrass. Esplin 9466 is the only Yeerk which has an Andalite host. Therefore, Visser Three also has the Andalite's ability to change its shape. Throughout the series, Esplin-Visser shows his acquisition of exceptionally powerful forms from many different planets, into which Esplin 9466 morphs. He later is elevated to the status of Visser One.
Ellimist: Seemingly all-powerful, a supernatural being which intermittently helps the Animorphs, including giving Tobias the ability to morph again. He acts to avoid direct involvement in the war to escape antagonizing Crayak, his evil counterpart, because that combat would cause galactic destruction. He subtly orchestrated many events which are key to the series. In The Ellimist Chronicles, it is revealed that Ellimist was once simply a member of an avian race, which by adaptive selection became a drastically different being.
Crayak: Ellimist's arch-enemy which seeks absolute control over all intelligent life. He develops a personal vendetta against Jake after Jake ruins his species of soldiers, the Howlers. Ellimist claimed that Crayak originated in another galaxy, from where a greater power drove him out; The Ellimist Chronicles details Crayak's early conflict with Ellimist prior to the evolution of both beings to acquire seemingly limitless power.

Secondary characters
Andalites:
 Aldrea-Iskillion-Falan – Aldrea is the daughter of Prince Seerow, a main character in Animorphs #34: The Prophecy and the heroine in The Hork-Bajir Chronicles. She has a strong personality mixed with a desire to do the right thing, not necessarily what is easy. Born an Andalite, her father Seerow gave the Yeerks' technology that they used to leave their home planet and begin their quest to dominate the universe. Her family was eventually sent to the Hork-Bajir home planet, where she bonded with an unusually intelligent Hork-Bajir named Dak Hamee. Aldrea obtained the ability to morph shortly after the technology was developed, and used it to fight the Yeerk invasion of the Hork-Bajir world after her family was murdered. She and Dak led the resistance, and a strong bond developed between the two of them. She eventually, though accidentally, became a Hork-Bajir female permanently, and she and Dak fell deeply in love, married and had a son named Seerow. Despite their resistance efforts, they were both eventually killed and their son was infested by the Yeerks, though his line later gave rise to the leaders of the free Hork-Bajir on Earth. A copy of Aldrea's memories and personality made before her death was later temporarily implanted in Cassie in order to gain access to a cache of Yeerk weapons stolen and hidden by Aldrea and the Hork-Bajir resistance on the Hork-Bajir homeworld.
 Alloran-Semitur-Corrass – Andalite host body of Visser Three. Alloran was an officer under Prince Seerow, who relieved his superior of duty after a force of Yeerks stole Andalite ships and left their planet thanks to technology provided to them by Seerow. Years later, having been promoted to the rank of War Prince, Alloran was placed in command of the Andalite forces sent to fight the Yeerk invasion of the Hork-Bajir homeworld. Unfortunately, the desperate situation on the planet led Alloran to decide that wiping out the Hork-Bajir with a virus was a better alternative than allowing them to be enslaved, and countless members of the species died as a result. Alloran was subsequently disgraced, and ended up serving on the crew of the same ship that Elfangor was assigned to as a junior officer. A mission that the pair went on with Elfangor's peer Arbron and a pair of humans led to Alloran's infestation by the Yeerk who would become Visser Three, who used Alloran's morphing abilities for many vile purposes throughout the years. After an attempt by Ax to kill Visser Three, Alloran was briefly left free to communicate with him, and encouraged him to continue the fight. Eventually he was freed from his infestation.
 Elfangor-Sirinial-Shamtul – Elfangor is the first alien the Animorphs meet in the series. He gives them the power to morph minutes before his death. His adventures are highlighted in the book called The Andalite Chronicles, which takes place before the main Animorphs series. He was a war prince, and the older brother of Aximili-Esgarrouth-Isthill. He was the sworn enemy of Visser Three, and - due to time spent as a human - the father of Tobias.
Auxiliary Animorphs: These were teenagers recruited from hospitals and rehabilitation centers where they were being treated for chronic diseases or learning to live with disabilities. The ability to morph restored some of the teenagers' bodies to perfect health, but failed to when the diseases or conditions were genetic.
David: A boy who joins the Animorphs after learning their secret. The Animorphs trust him at first, giving him the ability to morph and fight with them rather than allow the Yeerks to take him, but he betrays them. He comes to reason that it is morally okay to attempt to kill the Animorphs while they are morphed, as they are not humans during that time. Ultimately, they are forced to trick him into morphing into a rat and trap him permanently in the morph, leaving him stranded on an island only inhabited by rats. He returns later in the series, eventually asking Rachel to kill him. Whether Rachel kills David or not has never been established.
Drode: The Drode is an alien creature, described as being similar to a very dark purple dinosaur with wrinkled, pruny skin, and an oddly humanoid face. Little is known of the Drode, but it serves Crayak and usually shows up when he does.
Erek King: Erek King is a member of the Chee, a pacifistic android race created by an alien race called the Pemalites. After the destruction of the Pemalites at the hands of the Howlers, Erek, along with the rest of the Chee, escaped to Earth. They have lived on the planet for thousands of years, using incredibly advanced holographic technology to pass as human.
Hork-Bajir:
 Toby Hamee - Leader of the Free Hork-Bajir on Earth; a Seer or exceptionally intelligent member of the Hork-Bajir race.
 Jara Hamee - Toby's father and the descendant of Dak Hamee, a Hork-Bajir Seer, and Aldrea, an Andalite-turned-Hork-Bajir who led the Hork-Bajir resistance against the Yeerks. He was killed in action during the final battle.
 Ket  - Toby's mother and Jara Hamee's wife.
Howlers: A race of killers artificially created by Crayak and deployed as shock troopers against the inhabitants of various worlds. Seven of them were selected by Crayak to be pitted against the Animorphs and Erek the Chee in a contest between the Ellimist and Crayak concerning the fate of an offshoot of the Yeerk race who had found an alternative means of living. Jake eventually discovered that the Howlers were children, too young to understand what they were doing and seeing it all as a game, and the Animorphs managed to infect their collective memory with a flashback of Jake and Cassie kissing. The Howlers were thus ruined as a soldier race.
The One: An alien being who assimilates other beings; he makes a deal with the defeated Yeerks. He is the final antagonist of the series.
Tom Berenson: Jake's older brother, a Controller. His original Yeerk is actually promoted and meant to receive another host early in the series, but ends up in Jake instead; it subsequently dies, while Tom receives another Yeerk. This Yeerk eventually stole the cube that provided the morphing power to the Animorphs and delivered it to his fellow Yeerks, and was later subsequently killed by Rachel.
Hedrick Chapman: Vice-principal of the Animorphs' school and a Controller.
Yeerks: The main antagonists, described as small, slug-like parasites that enter various organisms' brains to control their behavior. They are dependent upon Kandrona rays to survive, and must leave their hosts every three days in order to enter a Yeerk pool where they may absorb these rays.
 Edriss 562 – Edriss 562 is a Yeerk that controls Marco's mother Eva. For most of the series, her rank is Visser One. She is the subject of the novel Visser, which describes her rise to and dramatic fall from power. She is the highest ranking of all the Yeerks in their military, and is only surpassed in importance by the Council of Thirteen.

Publication
Each book in the series revolved around a given event during the war waged between the Animorphs and the invading Yeerks. Within a year and a half after the first book was published, the series had close to ten million copies in print, with Scholastic claiming a "stronger initial sell-in", than any of its other series up to that time. The series debut was preceded by a large marketing campaign which included posters on buildings, giveaway items in bookstores, and ads on Nickelodeon TV.

American editions
In the United States, the books were most popular as A5-sized paperback volumes, and were usually between 150 and 200 pages long, divided into just under thirty chapters.

The front covers featured images of the narrating Animorph undergoing the various stages of one of the morphs from the story, with a few exceptions (noted in each book's article). Behind the morphing character were images of clouds and skies, which became more colorful and elaborate as the series progressed. All the covers of the regular series books had a small cutout over part of the full morph's anatomy, revealing a computer-generated illustration on the first page, which was printed on glossy paper. The illustration shared the image of the full morph with the front cover, but placed within an environment from the story. The book spines repeated the narrating character's face from the front cover, and the spine color changed with every new episode, resulting in a very colorful collection when viewed from any angle. A small excerpt from one of the book's chapters was printed on the inside of every front cover.
As of the eighth book, The Alien, the Animorphs logo, the author's name, and the book's title were printed in glossy, metallic-look ink, rather than the flat colors that had been used for the first seven books. In addition, the author's name and book title were surrounded by solid black rectangles. The majority of the books in the series were printed only in "metallic-ink editions". All further reprintings of the first seven books had this treatment applied to them as well.

The books in the series' final arc, beginning with the 45th book, The Revelation had yet another treatment applied to the cover, a variation on the new metallic style; the change affected only the main 'Animorphs' logo: instead of consisting of white letters superimposed on a metallic, colored background, the last ten books featured a logo with colored letters over a dark grey background, in contrast with the white logo background from the series' "opening arc". The final book, #54 The Beginning had a unique cover style, with the logo consisting of a glowing outline.

Every book featured an introduction to the series on the back cover, in the voice of Jake, one of the Animorphs.

We can't tell you who we are. Or where we live. It's too risky, and we've got to be careful. Really careful. So we don't trust anyone. Because if they find us... well, we just won't let them find us.

The thing you should know is that everyone is in really big trouble. Yeah. Even you.

As of book 51, The Absolute, the introduction read as follows:

Here's the deal these days: They know exactly who we are. They know exactly where we live. We've got a few secrets left, and we're gonna use them. But just know that the end is coming. And we don't know how much longer we can do this. How much longer can we fight.

What about you? Where will you be when it ends? Think about it. Think hard. Because the countdown has already begun...

In addition to this text, each book also carried an introduction, or teaser, to its own storyline.

Another feature of the books was a flipbook composed of the bottom right-hand corners of all of the book's pages. A step of the cover morph was printed on each page, less than an inch tall, in black-and-white. When the pages were flipped from front to back, the narrating Animorph could be seen morphing into the animal.

International editions
The Animorphs series was printed in over twenty-five languages and other English-language markets, and the books in those countries sometimes had different designs, layouts, cover quotes, and even different cover morphs, as is the case for the fifth book, The Predator, whose UK edition showed Marco morphing into a lobster, in contrast to the American edition's gorilla morph. Japanese-language covers were hand-drawn; The Invasion showed Jake morphing into his dog Homer, a morph that was featured on the cover of The Threat in the American editions. Gallimard Jeunesse is the French publisher and Tammi is the Finnish publisher. The German publisher, Ravensburger, has also published some of the volumes as audio plays.

Animorphs Classics
In 2010, Scholastic announced plans to re-release the series with new lenticular covers and updated pop culture references. The re-release lasted from May 2011 to September 2012, ending after #8: The Alien due to tepid sales.

Books 

The series consists of 54 books and includes ten companion books, eight of which fit into the series' continuity (the Animorphs Chronicles and Megamorphs books) and two that are gamebooks not fitting into the continuity (the Alternamorphs books).

Ghostwriters
Many of the novels from the #25-#52 range were written by ghostwriters. Typically, K. A. Applegate would write a detailed outline for each book, and a ghostwriter, usually one of Applegate's former editors or writing protégés, would spend a month or two writing the actual novel. After this, Applegate, and later her series editor, Tonya Alicia Martin, would edit the book to make it fit in with the series' tight continuity. Ghostwriters are credited for their help in the book's dedication page: "The author would like to thank [ghostwriter name] for his/her help in preparing this manuscript".

The only books in this range fully written by Applegate herself after #26: The Attack are #32: The Separation, #53: The Answer, #54: The Beginning and all of the Megamorphs and Chronicles books.

The following books in the series were ghostwritten:

 #25: The Extreme - Jeffrey Zeuhlke
 #27: The Exposed - Laura Battyanyi-Weiss (Due to an editorial oversight, Battyanyi-Weiss was uncredited for this book.)
 #28: The Experiment - Amy Garvey
 #29: The Sickness - Melinda Metz
 #30: The Reunion - Elise Donner 
 #31: The Conspiracy - Laura Battyanyi-Weiss
 #33: The Illusion - Ellen Geroux
 #34: The Prophecy - Melinda Metz
 #35: The Proposal - Jeffrey Zeuhlke
 #36: The Mutation - Erica Bobone
 #37: The Weakness - Elise Smith
 #38: The Arrival - Kimberly Morris
 #39: The Hidden - Laura Battyanyi-Weiss
 #40: The Other - Gina Gascone

 #41: The Familiar - Ellen Geroux
 #42: The Journey - Emily Costello
 #43: The Test - Ellen Geroux
 #44: The Unexpected - Lisa Harkrader
 #45: The Revelation - Ellen Geroux
 #46: The Deception - Elise Donner
 #47: The Resistance - Ellen Geroux
 #48: The Return - Kimberly Morris (Due to an editorial oversight, Lisa Harkrader was mistakenly credited for this book.)
 #49: The Diversion - Lisa Harkrader
 #50: The Ultimate - Kimberly Morris
 #51: The Absolute - Lisa Harkrader
 #52: The Sacrifice - Kimberly Morris
 Alternamorphs #1 - Tonya Alicia Martin (Applegate's series editor)
 Alternamorphs #2 - Emily Costello

Applegate originally intended to write every Animorphs book herself. However, due to many contributing factors—such as the birth of her child and the difficulties involved in writing Everworld (which was originally intended to be mostly ghostwritten, like Applegate's third Scholastic series Remnants), she ended up having a large number of the books ghostwritten.

Toys
The Animorphs toy line was introduced in 1999 by Hasbro. They were marketed as part of the Transformers series, despite there being no in-universe connection between the two franchises. However, the Animorphs toys were commercially unsuccessful and the toy line was soon cancelled. After the cancellation, several toys planned to be part of the Animorphs line were slightly remodeled and released as part of the Beast Wars Mutants line.

Adaptations

Television series 
A television series of the same name ran from September 1998 to March 2000 in the United States and Canada. Animorphs comprised 26 episodes over two seasons, which aired on YTV (first season) and Global (second season) in Canada and Nickelodeon in the United States.

Film 
In September 2015, several film websites began reporting rumors that Universal Pictures had plans to adapt the book series into a film, based on a report by the film website The Tracking Board. The site also claimed that Universal would be working with Silvertongue Films, a production house launched to develop Scholastic books into feature films, and that Deborah Forte would be producing.

In June 2020, it was formally announced that an Animorphs film would be produced by Scholastic Entertainment, and Picturestart, the latter run by Erik Feig and Lucy Kitada. Script development will be overseen by Caitlin Friedman and Royce Reeves Darby.

Animorphs authors Katherine Applegate and Michael Grant initially agreed to collaborate with Paramount Pictures, and Nickelodeon Movies, but in October 2020 Grant announced via Twitter that he and Applegate would not be a part of the film's production, citing "creative differences". Grant later clarified his remark, wishing the producers the best and noting he and Applegate simply weren't being involved enough in the production process.

Video games 
Animorphs: Know the Secret is an action-adventure game, released for Microsoft Windows. Developed by Gigawatt Studios and published by Infogrames, it lets the player to switch control between four of the Animorphs (Cassie, Jake, Marco and Rachel). They will explore different environments searching for clues as to why the activities of Yeerks have gone down. The Animorphs have access to a number of specific forms they can change into, which can increase by finding more animals on the way.

Animorphs: Shattered Reality is a platform video game, released for PlayStation. Developed by SingleTrac, it revolves around four of the Animorphs trying to find pieces of the Continuum Crystal before Visser Three does.

A Game Boy Color game was also published by Ubisoft.

Audiobooks
In 2020 Scholastic Audio began releasing an uncut audio version of the series on Audible. Books 1 and 2 were released January 7, 2020 with subsequent releases taking place on the first or second Tuesday of each month for 5 months. There was a brief hiatus, then books 11 and 12 were released January 26, 2021 following the same pattern. After another hiatus 21 and 22 were released November 8, 2021 following the same pattern. There has been no official announcement for books 31 and on. 6 narrators are being used, one for each of the main characters. MacLeod Andrews provides the narration for Jake, Emily Ellet for Rachel, Michael Crouch for Tobias, Sisi Aisha Johnson for Cassie, Ramón de Ocampo for Marco, and Adam Verner for Ax.

Graphic novels 
Scholastic announced plans to launch a graphic novel adaptation of Animorphs via its Scholastic Graphix imprint. The first release, adapting The Invasion, was released on October 6, 2020, with art by Eisner-Award nominee Chris Grine. The second novel, adapting The Visitor, was released on October 5, 2021. The third novel, adapting The Encounter, was released on October 4, 2022. The fourth novel, adapting The Message, according to Amazon, will be released on December 5, 2023.

References

External links 

 

 
Book series introduced in 1996
American young adult novels
Juvenile series
Collaborative book series
Publications established in 1996
Scholastic franchises
Science fiction novel series
Fiction about shapeshifting
Fiction about parasites
Fiction about mind control
American novels adapted into television shows
Novels adapted into video games
Young adult novel series
Books with cover art by David Burroughs Mattingly
1990s science fiction novels
1990s fantasy novels
2000s science fiction novels
2000s fantasy novels
Novels about extraterrestrial life
Novels set in California
Novels set in the 1990s
Works about child soldiers
Coming-of-age fiction
Novels by Michael Grant